Loyang Bus Depot is the second bus depot to be built by the Land Transport Authority in Singapore. It is located at Loyang Way at the junction of Pasir Ris Drive 3 and houses 31 services under the Loyang Bus Package. Loyang Bus Depot is currently being operated by Go-Ahead Singapore under the contracting model package.

Completed in 2015, the new bus depot is able to accommodate about 500 buses and be equipped with facilities for daily bus operations, bus maintenance and a rest area for bus drivers. On 19 June 2016, the Loyang Bus Depot was officially opened by MP for Pasir Ris-Punggol Group Representation Constituency, Zainal Sapari and the Group Chief Executive of the Go-Ahead Group David Brown. Loyang Bus Depot Carnival was also held on the same day to allow the public to tour the depot and also learn more about Go-Ahead Singapore.

History
Announced by LTA on 29 May 2013, the bus depot will be the second depot that LTA is developing and funding, as part of the review of the enhanced structural assistance that Government is providing the bus industry announced in Committee of Supply (COS) 2012. The depot is intended to accommodate the additional buses that it is bringing in over the next few years. The operator's existing bus depots and bus park are reaching full capacity, and the new facility is necessary to support the higher number of buses as the overall bus capacity is progressively increased under the Bus Service Enhancement Programme (BSEP).

On 11 December 2015, LTA handed the depot to Go-Ahead Singapore Pte Ltd for the operator to prepare for operations, as well as the recruitment and training of bus captains and technicians, to support a smooth transition.

References

Bus garages
Bus stations in Singapore
2016 establishments in Singapore